Lee Jonathan Beevers (born 4 December 1983) is a former professional footballer who played as a defender or midfielder. He previously had spells with Ipswich Town, Boston United, Lincoln City, Colchester United, Walsall and Mansfield Town. Born in England, he made seven appearances for the Wales U21 national team.

Career

Ipswich Town
Beevers was spotted by Ipswich Town scout Sonny Sweeney while playing in his hometown of Doncaster and began commuting to Ipswich at weekends to represent the club's School of Excellence, joining the club on a full-time basis as a scholar in July 2000 and signing his first professional contract in March 2001. On 22 January 2003, Beevers and fellow young professional Steve Burton were told by Ipswich's manager Joe Royle that their contracts would not be renewed at the end of the season and that they were free to seek new clubs. The following week, Beevers joined Boston United on trial appearing for the club's reserve team in a 3–0 victory over Lincoln City's reserve team on 29 January 2003. In February 2003 he joined Colchester United on trial but he did not earn a contract from the club and returned to Portman Road. On 26 March 2003 Beevers and fellow Ipswich Town youngster Robert Dickinson joined Boston United on loan until the end of the season. Having been an unused substitute for the 2–1 home victory over Macclesfield Town on 26 April 2003, he made his Football League debut as an 82nd-minute substitute for Peter Costello in the 2–1 victory at Cambridge United on 3 May 2003.

Boston United
On 9 June 2003, Beevers agreed a one-year contract to join Boston United on a full-time basis. His performances at Boston earned him numerous awards whilst at the club, and also got the attention of the Welsh national team, where he has represented his country at Under-21 level.

Beevers can play anywhere along the defensive line, however, his most adept position is right-back. Beevers has also demonstrated that he is capable of playing as a right-sided wing-back and in front of the defensive line as both a defensive midfielder and a central midfielder too.

Lincoln City

His solid performances at Lincoln have earned him a lot of respect amongst the fans, as his performances at Boston did for their fans. In the 2005–06 season, he played a very vital role in the team, however, due to the teams tactical system back then, he sometimes got scrutinised for mistakes and was often the scapegoat when things weren't going too well. Thus far in the 2006–07 season, he has adapted very well to the new tactical system employed by new Head Coach Peter Jackson, and his form in various positions on the pitch has meant that he has been an ever-present in the squad.

Colchester United
On 24 June 2009 he agreed to join Football League One outfit Colchester United on a two-year contract.

Despite starting the first few games relatively brightly for Colchester United under then manager Paul Lambert, Beevers sustained an injury to his shoulder during a competitive match against Milton Keynes Dons. This resulted in him missing three months of the season, over which period he was plagued by other smaller injuries postponing his return to action. Due to his long absence and lack of fitness, he failed to make an impact in the 2009–10 season and didn't manage to break back into the starting line-up, only making a handful of substitution appearances.

Beevers started pre season in a new holding midfield role where he impressed enough to earn himself a sub appearance at Exeter. Despite making a handful of appearances, mainly from the bench, in 2010–11, he was released from his contract on 10 May 2011 and the U's continued shaping their squad for the new season.

Walsall
Beevers signed a one-year contract with Walsall on 14 July 2011.

Mansfield Town
After one season with Walsall, Beevers signed for Mansfield Town on a one-year contract. After making over 40 appearances and helping the club to the 2012–13 Conference National title, it was announced that Mansfield would be renewing Beevers' contract. He was released from the Stags on 6 May 2015.

Return to Lincoln City
On 14 May 2015 he returned to Lincoln City signing a two-year contract at the Football Conference side following his release from Mansfield Town 9 days previously. This made Beevers the Imps second signing of the summer after fellow Mansfield Town player Matt Rhead signed on the same day, also on a two-year deal. Beevers made his debut in a 1–1 draw with Cheltenham Town.

Gainsborough Trinity
After temporarily retiring from the professional game, Beevers signed for Gainsborough Trinity on 5 January 2018, having been training with the club since the summer of 2017. Beevers then retired from professional football to become a coach at Alfreton Town.

Career statistics

Club

Honours
Individual
Boston United Supporters Player of the Year: 2003–04
Lincoln City Supporters Player of the Year: 2006–07

References

External links

Unofficial Lee Beevers Profile at The Forgotten Imp

1983 births
Living people
Footballers from Doncaster
English footballers
Welsh footballers
Wales under-21 international footballers
Ipswich Town F.C. players
Boston United F.C. players
Lincoln City F.C. players
Colchester United F.C. players
Walsall F.C. players
Mansfield Town F.C. players
English Football League players
National League (English football) players
Association football fullbacks
Association football midfielders